Sherie Rene Scott (born February 8, 1967) is an American actress, singer, writer and producer. She has been seen in multiple Broadway and off-Broadway plays and musicals, on numerous solo and original cast recordings, and in various film and television roles.

Early life and education 
Scott was born in Kentucky. When she was four years old, her family moved to Topeka, Kansas, where she grew up. Scott moved from Topeka to New York City when she was 18 to attend the Neighborhood Playhouse School of the Theatre. She is a writer in residence at Second Stage Theater and lives with her son in New York City.

Career 
On Broadway, Scott has starred in Dirty Rotten Scoundrels, garnering nominations for a Tony Award, a Drama Desk Award and an Outer Critics Circle Award. She starred as Amneris in Elton John and Tim Rice's Aida (2000), for which she won the Clarence Derwent Award and was a Drama League Honoree. The single "A Step Too Far" performed by Elton John, Heather Headley and Sherie Rene Scott from the 1999 Elton John And Tim Rice Aida concept album charted at #15.

Scott's You May Now Worship Me, co-authored with Dick Scanlan, raised $200,000 to benefit the Phyllis Newman's Women's Health Initiative of The Actor's Fund. The one night only fundraiser premiered March 31, 2008 at The Eugene O'Neill Theatre. You May Now Worship Me would later become the concept behind Everyday Rapture.

In 2010, Scott starred in the critically acclaimed production Everyday Rapture, which Scott wrote with co-author Dick Scanlan. Everyday Rapture began its run on Broadway at the American Airlines Theatre in previews April 19, 2010, and officially opened on April 29, 2010. The show played to sold out audiences throughout the run, finally ending its limited engagement on July 11, 2010. Scott received Tony Award nominations for Best Book, and Best Leading Actress in a Musical, and Drama Desk Award nominations in the categories of Best Leading Actress, Best Book, and Best Musical for Rapture.

Other Broadway credits include Sally Simpson in Tommy (1993), Marty in Grease (1995–96), and Maureen in Rent (1997). She originated the role of Ursula in The Little Mermaid (2007) for which she received her second Outer Critics Circle Award nomination for Outstanding Featured Actress in a Musical. She starred as Pepa in the musical adaptation of Women on the Verge of a Nervous Breakdown, on Broadway, which opened on November 4, 2010. For this role she was nominated for the Drama Desk Award for Outstanding Actress in a Musical.

Scott appeared in The Front Page as Mollie Malloy with an all-star cast including Nathan Lane, John Slattery, Holland Taylor, John Goodman, Jefferson Mays and Robert Morse. Jack O'Brien directed the production that premiered on Broadway in fall 2016 at the Broadhurst Theatre.

Whorl Inside a Loop, written by Scott and Dick Scanlan, premiered August 27, 2015 at the Second Stage Theatre. Directed by Michael Mayer and Scanlan, Whorl garnered critical acclaim, including several 'Best of 2015 Theater' Lists.

Off-Broadway roles include John Guare's play Landscape of the Body at the Signature Theatre, for which she received a 2006 Obie Award and a Lucille Lortel Award and was a Drama League honoree. Musicals include Jason Robert Brown's The Last Five Years for which she received a Drama Desk Award nomination, and the title role in Debbie Does Dallas: The Musical.

Scott can be heard on the original off-Broadway cast recording of The Last Five Years along with Norbert Leo Butz. She is an executive producer of the film The Last Five Years starring Anna Kendrick and Jeremy Jordan. Scott also makes an appearance in the film.

In regional theatre, she has appeared in world premiere productions of Randy Newman's Faust (1995). She appeared in Kander and Ebb's Over and Over, at the Signature Theatre, which was a musical adaptation of The Skin of Our Teeth, receiving a nomination for a Helen Hayes Award.

Scott co-founded the Grammy Award–winning Sh-K-Boom Records and Ghostlight Records, which seeks to preserve original cast albums and solo recordings by Broadway artists. The records, produced over 150 albums, garnered 3 Grammy awards, and 12 Grammy nominations. SKB/Ghostlight's Grammy Awards include those for the cast albums of In the Heights, The Book of Mormon and Beautiful. SKB/Ghostlight received a 2006 Drama Desk Award for dedication to the preservation of musical theatre through cast recordings. The label won their first Grammy in 2009 for the Original Cast Recording of In The Heights. Scott can be heard on numerous Grammy Award-winning and OBC cast albums, the Billboard hit single "A Step Too Far" with Elton John, "The Folks Who Live On The Hill" with jazz great Bill Charlap, as well as the critically acclaimed, "Sherie Rene…Men I've Had,"  Everyday Rapture the original Broadway cast album, and All Will Be Well:  The Piece Of Meat Studio Sessions, produced with Todd Almond.

Scott did a try-out of her new, "critically acclaimed" work, Piece of Meat, in collaboration with Todd Almond, in the 2012 Adelaide Cabaret Festival and premiered it in New York City at 54 Below from October 16–27, 2012.

From July 9–28, 2019, she wrote and starred in an original musical collaboration titled TWOHANDER at Feinstein's/54 Below alongside Norbert Leo Butz, with musical director Todd Almond. Scott previously shared the stage with Butz in the original productions of the musicals Dirty Rotten Scoundrels and The Last Five Years.

Work

Broadway

Other theatre

Filmography

Discography
1999 Elton John And Tim Rice's Aida (1999 Concept Album) – Island Records
2000 Sherie Rene Scott: Men I've Had (Solo CD) – Sh-K-Boom Records
2000 Aida (Original Broadway Cast Recording) – Disney
2002 Debbie Does Dallas (Off-Broadway Cast Recording) – Sh-K-Boom Records
2002 The Last Five Years (Off-Broadway Cast Recording) – Sh-K-Boom Records
2005 Bright Lights, Big City (Cast Recording Recording) – Sh-K-Boom Records
2005 Hair (Actors' Fund of America Benefit Recording) – Sh-K-Boom Records
2005 Dirty Rotten Scoundrels (Original Broadway Cast Recording) – Sh-K-Boom Records
2008 Disney's The Little Mermaid (Original Broadway Cast Recording) – Disney
2010 Everyday Rapture (Original Broadway Cast Recording) – Sh-K-Boom Records
2011 Women on the Verge of a Nervous Breakdown (Original Broadway Cast Recording) – Sh-K-Boom Records

Awards and nominations

Notes

External links

Review of Everyday Rapture Broadway musical about Sherie Rene Scott and starring her.  Opened May 7, 2010

1967 births
American film actresses
American musical theatre actresses
Living people
Neighborhood Playhouse School of the Theatre alumni
Actresses from Kentucky
21st-century American actresses
20th-century American actresses
Singers from Kentucky
Writers from Kentucky